Ancient Mexico was an exhibition by William Bullock of casts of Aztec artefacts and both copies and originals of Aztec codices, held in 1824 in the Egyptian Hall in Piccadilly, London. Objects exhibited included the "calendar stone" (described as "Montezuma's watch"), the statue of Coatlicue (called "Teoyamiqui"), the Stone of Tizoc, and an unidentified statue of a giant serpent.

References

 
 

Mesoamerican art exhibitions
1824 in England
Aztec artifacts
19th century in London